Palmitoyl protein hydrolase/thioesterases is an enzyme (EC 3.1.2.22) that removes thioester-linked fatty acyl groups such as palmitate from modified cysteine residues in proteins or peptides during lysosomal degradation. It catalyzes the reaction 

palmitoyl[protein] + H2O  palmitate + protein

This enzyme belongs to the family of hydrolases, specifically those acting on thioester bonds.  The systematic name is palmitoyl[protein] hydrolase. Other names in common use include palmitoyl-protein thioesterase, and palmitoyl-(protein) hydrolase.  This enzyme participates in fatty acid elongation in mitochondria.

Neuronal ceroid lipofuscinoses (NCL) represent a group of encephalopathies that occur in 1 in 12,500 children. Mutations in the palmitoyl protein thioesterase gene causing infantile neuronal ceroid lipofuscinosis. The most common mutation results in intracellular accumulation of the polypeptide and undetectable enzyme activity in the brain. Direct sequencing of cDNAs derived from brain RNA of INCL patients has shown a mis-sense transversion of A to T at nucleotide position 364, which results in substitution of Trp for Arg at position 122 in the protein - Arg 122 is immediately adjacent to a lipase consensus sequence that contains the putative active site Ser of PPT. The occurrence of this and two other independent mutations in the PPT gene strongly suggests that defects in this gene cause INCL.

Examples 

Human proteins containing this domain include:

Structural studies

See also
 palmitoyl
 Acyl-protein thioesterases

References

Further reading

External links
 
  GeneReviews/NCBI/NIH/UW entry on Neuronal Ceroid-Lipofuscinoses

EC 3.1.2
Enzymes of known structure
Peripheral membrane proteins